The Arado Ar 231 was a lightweight floatplane, developed during World War II in Germany as a scout plane for submarines by Arado. The need to be stored inside the submarine necessitated compromises in design that made this single-seat seaplane of little practical use.

Design and development
Designed from the outset for use on U-boat "cruisers", like the Type XI B, the Ar 231 was a light parasol-wing aircraft. The aircraft was powered by a 119 kW (160 hp) Hirth HM 501 inline engine, weighed around 1,000 kg (2,200 lb), and had a 10 m (33 ft) wingspan. The design led to a simple and compact aircraft that could be fitted into a storage cylinder only 2 m (6 ft 7 in) in diameter. For ease of storage, the Ar 231's wings featured detachable sections that two operators could remove in less than six minutes. One unusual feature was an offset wing design, with the right wing root attaching to the wing's tilted center section (elevated above the fuselage, as on all parasol-wing designs) and lower than the left wing root, to allow the wings to overlap when folded, so as to occupy less space.

Operational history
Testing soon revealed the Ar 231s to be fragile, underpowered, and difficult to fly even during calm weather, and, as a result, development ended in favour of the Focke Achgelis Fa 330 gyroglider. Some of the testing was done on the auxiliary cruiser Stier, two of the six prototypes being taken on one voyage.

Specifications (Ar 231 V1)

See also

References

External links

 Arado Ar 231

Ar 231
Parasol-wing aircraft
1940s German military reconnaissance aircraft
Floatplanes
Submarine-borne aircraft
Single-engined tractor aircraft
Aircraft first flown in 1941